Jean-Jacques Martigne (born 4 August 1960) is a French rower. He competed at the 1984 Summer Olympics and the 1988 Summer Olympics.

References

External links
 

1960 births
Living people
French male rowers
Olympic rowers of France
Rowers at the 1984 Summer Olympics
Rowers at the 1988 Summer Olympics
Place of birth missing (living people)